Anthranil (2,1-benzisoxazole) is an organic compound with a molecular formula C7H5NO, which features a fused benzene-isoxazole bicyclic ring structure. It is an isomer of the more common compounds benzoxazole and benzisoxazole, which have their oxygen atoms located in the 1-position. The locations of the heteroatoms in anthranil results in disrupted aromaticity, making it by far the least stable of the 3 structural isomers.

References

Aromatic bases
Simple aromatic rings